"They Suffocate at Night" is the first single from the album Freaks by British band Pulp, released in 1987. The song and its B-side "Tunnel" were later included on the compilation album Masters of the Universe.

Track listing
All songs written and composed by  Pulp.

7" vinyl
"They Suffocate at Night" (edited version) – 4:00
"Tunnel" (cut-up version) – 4:30

12" vinyl
"They Suffocate at Night" (uncut version) – 6:17
"Tunnel" (full-length version) – 8:13

References

1987 singles
Pulp (band) songs
Songs written by Jarvis Cocker
Fire Records (UK) singles
1986 songs
Songs written by Russell Senior
Songs written by Candida Doyle